Symphlebia favillacea is a moth in the family Erebidae first described by Walter Rothschild in 1909. It is found in Suriname and French Guiana.

References

favillacea
Moths described in 1909